Duncan Montgomery Gray III is an Episcopal bishop who served as the ninth Bishop of Mississippi from 2003 till 2015. His grandfather, Duncan Montgomery Gray Sr. was the fifth Bishop of Mississippi, while his father, Duncan M. Gray Jr., was the seventh Bishop of Mississippi.

Biography
Gray graduated from the University of Mississippi in 1971 and Virginia Theological Seminary after which he was ordained deacon in 1975 and priest a year later. His first post was as curate of St James' Church in Greenville, Mississippi. He also served as chaplain of Trinity School in New Orleans an associate priest at Holy Communion Church in Memphis, Tennessee. He later became rector of St Peter's Church in Oxford, Mississippi. On February 26, 2000, Gray was elected Coadjutor Bishop of Mississippi and was consecrated on June 17 of the same year. He succeeded as bishop in 2003 and retired in 2015.

References

Living people
21st-century Anglican bishops in the United States
Year of birth missing (living people)
Episcopal bishops of Mississippi